New Maldives began as a group of young ministers who supported the dictatorship of President Gayoom and claimed to be working to usher in liberal democracy to the Maldives. Its most public proponent is Ahmed Shaheed, supported by  Hassan Saeed and Mohamed Jameel Ahmed, who were serving as Foreign Minister, Attorney-General and Justice Minister, respectively. The New Maldives was launched in December 2005 in Colombo, Sri Lanka, and was initially used by the media as a pejorative term.

Origins 
New Maldives developed out of the close relationship between Hassan Saeed, who became the Attorney-General in November 2003, and Ahmed Shaheed when the latter was appointed as Chief Government Spokesman in May 2004. Both Saeed and Shaheed are alumni of the University of Queensland where they obtained their PhDs. They used their positions as Chief Legal Adviser to the President and Director of Communications respectively to dismantle the autocratic regime of Gayoom.

The public widely believed Saeed and Shaheed engineered the dismissal of the bulk of the Old Guard from the Cabinet of President Gayoom in May 2005. Shaheed became the Foreign Minister in the new Cabinet line-up, replacing Fathulla Jameel, who had served 28 years as Foreign Minister.

Shaheed claims to have coined the term New Maldives in November 2005 as a vision of the political reforms that were being implemented by President Gayoom in his sixth term in office. The concept was unveiled to the public in December 2005 at a press conference hosted by the Maldives High Commission in Colombo. The ministers in the panel were Foreign Minister Shaheed, Attorney General Saeed, Justice Minister Mohamed Jameel Ahmed, and Information Minister Mohamed Nasheed. Media reports of the event labeled the participating ministers as New Maldives.

Political Take-Off 
As a ginger group, the New Maldives reached their high point when they produced the Roadmap for the Reform Agenda in March 2006, through which they tied the president to time-bound steps to create a new political order in the Maldives. The campaign to produce the Roadmap, January – March 2006, saw the New Maldives ministers clash openly with the Old Guard, especially over the insertion of provisions in the Roadmap to combat corruption and to subscribe to international human rights norms. The New Maldives claims credit for having acceded to all the major international human rights treaties.

By April 2006, the Old Guard led by the President's half-brother, Abdulla Yameen, clashed openly with the New Maldives ministers during the elections for the DRP Council. Saeed and Shaheed were joined by other new ministers: Youth Minister Hussain Hilmy, Atolls Minister Waheed Deen, Construction Minister Mauroof Jameel, Housing Minister Ibrahim Rafeeg, Gender Minister Ayesha Didi and other young politicians such as Imad Solih and Lubna Zahir Hussain. In the elections that followed, the New Maldives faction gained a majority of the seats in the council. In the process, the New Maldives effectively destroyed the careers of both Ilyas Ibrahim and Abdulla Yameen, who had been the leading contenders to succeed President Gayoom.

Saeed was elected as one of the four Deputy Leaders and became the rising star of Maldivian politics.

Westminster House Talks 
Shortly after the election victory, Shaheed and Saeed engineered the Westminster House process, through which they pardoned and released a number of high-profile dissidents who were languishing in jail or facing politically motivated prosecutions. These were steps towards a multiparty dialogue process supervised by the British Government designed to speed up the stalled constitutional reforms. However, both Gayoom and Yameen, who feared that British mediation would mean that the Gayoom might not be able to run for a seventh term in office, derailed the process.

Open Clash with Gayoom 
The breach between Gayoom and the New Maldives began to become visible by 10 December 2006, when the Attorney-General declared that the Roadmap was being used to introduce only paper reforms. This breach became wider when he further called on the Chief Justice to choose between executive functions and judicial functions in a speech given in January 2007. The breach between the New Maldives and Gayoom intensified as the date for the referendum on a future system of government approached. New Maldives favoured a presidential system with two-term limitation and clear separation of powers while Gayoom and Yameen favoured a prime ministerial system that would enable Gayoom to seek re-election. Finally, by July 2007, Shaheed openly accused Gayoom of manipulating and corrupting the parliament for his personal gain while Saeed and Jameel resigned to protest over Gayoom's attempts to obstruct the reform roadmap.

Launching of the New Maldives Movement 
Having left the Cabinet, the trio launched the New Maldives Movement on 29 August 2007 in Colombo, and traveled to London and Brussels to generate international support for the project. Upon return to the Maldives, the group encouraged the formation of a united front of pro-democracy groups as the National Unity Alliance. The New Maldives Movement became an important actor within the Alliance.

Banning of New Maldives 
In early January, the official newspaper of the governing DRP, Hamaroalhi, accused New Maldives of fostering terrorism. On 18 January 2008, the Minister for Legal Reform and Government Spokesman Mohamed Nasheed declared that New Maldives Movement had not sought registration with the Home Minister and was therefore an illegal movement. Ten days later, the Home Minister officially banned the New Maldives Movement led by the three ex-ministers and granted a licence to two members of the DRP to operate an NGO by the name of New Maldives Movement. The Home Minister also warned that the ex-ministers would face two years in prison if they used the tag of New Maldives Movement.

Leadership Challenge
Hassan Saeed, with Shaheed as his running mate, contested the first-ever multi-party presidential elections held in the Maldives in October 2008 on an independent ticket. At the start of the campaign, Saeed successfully overcame attempts to disqualify his candidature on the basis of his age (he was 38 at that time) and on the grounds of the nationality of his wife. Immediately afterward, the government banned, as un-Islamic, an academic book that Saeed had published four years previously on freedom of religion. The New Maldives team were blacked out from the state media for much of the campaign, until they threatened to take legal action against the government under the new Constitution that came into force a few weeks ahead of the election. In the first round, Saeed and Shaheed polled nearly 17% of the popular vote and having come third in the race, just failed to qualify for the second round run-off. However they pledged immediate and unconditional support to the contender, Mohamed Nasheed, and formed a coalition that defeated the 30-year-old regime on 28 October 2008.

In the government that was formed on 11 November 2008, Shaheed became the Foreign Minister, Jameel the Science and Technology Minister and Saeed Special Adviser to the President. Saeed quit as Adviser on 18 February 2009, alleging that the new president had betrayed the trust the people had placed in him by violating the Constitution and abusing power.

Entry into Parliament
On 27 January 2009, the New Maldives Movement was formally registered as the Dhivehi Qawmee Party, and in the elections for the parliament held on 9 May, the Dhivehi Qawmee Party secured 3 seats.

External links
Longest Serving Leader
New Maldives Letter
FM Quits
Threat to Democracy
New Maldives

References

Organisations based in the Maldives
Politics of the Maldives